Until the Night is a 2004 American drama film written and directed  by Gregory Hatanaka and starring  Norman Reedus, Kathleen Robertson, Missy Crider and Sean Young.

Premise
Robert (Norman Reedus) is a writer who hasn't done much writing lately; instead, he's busy pushing the envelope with his toxic mix of boredom, drugs and a dalliance with a married woman, Elizabeth (Kathleen Robertson). In spite of Elizabeth's marital status, Robert falls for her completely—a commitment that just may blow up in his face, along with the rest of his life.

Cast

  Norman Reedus as Robert
  Kathleen Robertson as  Elizabeth 
  Missy Crider as Mina
  Sean Young as Cosma 
  Sarah Lassez as  Karina 
  Michael T. Weiss as Daniel
  Matthew Settle as Michael
  Aimee Graham as Cynthia
  Boyd Kestner as David  
  Kaila Yu as Ali
  Stanley B. Herman as Dr. Meyers
  Danielle James as Molly
  Matthew Mahaney	as Derek
  Doralina Silander as Vanessa
  Paula Labaredas	as Melanie
  Ella Valentino as Action Girl
  Danielle Petty as Kelly
  Rachel Belofsky as Sarah
  Jana Thompson as Shauna
  Crash as Bartender
  Michael Raye as	Reporter #1
  Harry H. Novak as Reporter
  Tom Porterhouse	as Reporter #3
  Annabel Blanchard as Reporter #4
  April Wilson as Reporter #5
  Jasmine Jong Ok Kang as Reporter #6
  Steve Lustgarten as Reporter
  Young Man Kang as Reporter
  Anthony McBride	as Reporter
  Valerie Swift as Reporter
  Carisa Engle as	Reporter
  Craig Sheftall as Barfly
  Jeff Milne as Guitarist/Vocalist

References

External links

2004 drama films
American drama films
2000s English-language films
Films directed by Gregory Hatanaka
2000s American films